Ketil is a Norwegian masculine given name, and may refer to:

 Ketil Askildt (1900-1978), Norwegian discus thrower
 Ketil Bjørnstad (born 1952), Norwegian pianist
 Ketil Flatnose (9th century), Norwegian hersir
 Ketil Haugsand (21st century), Norwegian harpsichordist
 Ketil Lenning (born 1950), Norwegian businessperson
 Ketil Lund (born 1939), Norwegian judge
 Ketil Motzfeldt (1814-1889), Norwegian politician
 Ketil Skogen (1884-1970), Norwegian politician
 Ketil Solvik-Olsen (born 1972), Norwegian politician
 Ketil Stokkan (born 1956), Norwegian singer
 Ketil Thorkelsson (9th century), Norwegian hersir
 Lars Ketil Strand (born 1924), Norwegian forester
 Ketil (mountain)

See also

 Kjetil
 Kjeld
 Kjell

Norwegian masculine given names